Glenea mira is a species of beetle in the family Cerambycidae. It was described by Karl Jordan in 1903.

Subspecies
 Glenea mira allardi Breuning, 1972
 Glenea mira bernardii Breuning, 1977
 Glenea mira mira Jordan, 1903

References

mira
Beetles described in 1903